The Chevrolet Onix is a subcompact car launched by American automaker Chevrolet in Brazil at the 2012 São Paulo International Motor Show and the second generation in China at the 2019 Shanghai Auto Show. In Brazil, it was launched to succeed Chevrolet Corsa and some versions of Chevrolet Celta. Mainly produced in General Motors Brazil’s plants in Gravataí and São Caetano do Sul, the Onix is a five-door hatchback. A sedan version is sold as the Chevrolet Onix Plus in Brazil, and the Onix sedan in Colombia. The Onix has also been produced in Uzbekistan since 2022 by UzAuto Motors.

The Onix was Latin America’s best selling car in the year 2018, with sales of over 249,552 units.

First generation (2013) 

The first generation Onix was available in three trim levels (LS, LT and LTZ) with two 4-cylinder engines, the 1.0-liter producing  (gasoline)/ (ethanol) and 1.4-liter  (gasoline)/ (ethanol) offering automatic or five-speed manual transmission.  In Brazil, the 4-door sedan variant was known as the Chevrolet Prisma.

For 2017, the Onix and Prisma received a facelift, along with interior improvements.  A touchscreen was added with Android Auto and Apple CarPlay support.  The LS trim level kept the original front end and became known as the Onix Joy and Prisma Joy, leaving the LT as the base trim for the updated Onix/Prisma. A crossover-like version called the Onix Activ was also added, with raised suspension, plastic body cladding and roof rack.

In late 2019, the Onix and Prisma were replaced in Brazil by the second-generation Onix and Onix Plus, respectively.  However, the Onix Joy and Prisma Joy remained available, and were renamed Joy and Joy Plus, respectively. The Joy and Joy Plus have been built at the São Caetano do Sul plant in Brazil from 2019 through 2022. Production will move to GM Colmotores in Colombia in early 2023.

Technical details
Specs include front-wheel drive, MacPherson strut front and twist-beam rear suspension, and (in the three versions shown) dual airbags, ABS and power steering. In February 2013, the new Prisma, the sedan version of the Onix, with a trunk of 500 liters, was launched.

The 1.0 versions are fitted with 14" wheels, with 15" fitted to the 1.4 models.

Safety
In December 2014, the Chevrolet Onix in its most basic Latin American configuration with 2 airbags was evaluated under the Latin NCAP assessment and achieved a 3-star safety rating for adults and 2-star safety rating for children:

In May 2017, the Chevrolet Onix in its most basic Latin American configuration with 2 airbags and no ESC was re-evaluated under the Latin NCAP assessment, using the 2016 Assessment Protocol, and achieved a 0-star safety rating for adults and 3-star safety for children.

In January 2018, an updated Chevrolet Onix in its most basic Latin American configuration with 2 airbags and no ESC was evaluated under the Latin NCAP assessment, and achieved a 3-star safety rating for adults and 3-star safety for children.

Gallery

Second generation (2019) 

In April 2019, a new sedan named the Onix was launched in China with the Chinese name  . The Onix replaces both the Sonic and Cavalier in the Chinese market, and is slightly larger than the Prisma/Onix sedan.  It uses the GEM (Global Emerging Markets) platform.

A naturally aspirated 1.0 L 3-cylinder DVVT engine is also available for the manual 320 trim. Brazilian versions resort to port-injection for both the turbocharged and the naturally aspirated versions.

The first version of the Onix to debut was the Onix Redline.  It features black exterior trim with red accents, and a two-tone interior.

The Onix is also produced in Uzbekistan since 2022 by UzAuto Motors. Sales began at the end of 2022.

Markets

Brazil
In Brazil, the new sedan debuted in September 2019 as the "Onix Plus", while the hatchback went on sale in November 2019.  In addition to the LT and LTZ trim levels from the previous generation, a new top-level Premier level was added.  The Onix Plus was rated 5 stars by Latin NCAP.

All versions of new Onix and Onix Plus have 6 airbags, ABS brakes and electronic stability control.

In 2019, the Chevrolet Onix was the best-selling car model in Brazil, for the fifth consecutive year, with a total of 268,066 sales. It was also the best-selling model in Latin America.

Uruguay, Argentina and Paraguay
As engines up to 1.0L are not benefitted with a lower taxation, a naturally-aspirated 1.2L engine always combined with a 5-speed manual transmission is available for the entry-level versions instead of the smaller one offered in Brazil where the Onix for Uruguay, Argentina and Paraguay is made. Turbo versions retain the 1.0L displacement, while being offered with either a 5-speed manual or a 6-speed automatic. Other difference from the Onix sold in Brazil is the absence of flex fuel capability.

Mexico
The Onix was launched in the Mexican market in spring of 2020 as well to place itself between the Cavalier and the Sail, the latter being known as Aveo in that country.

The LT and LS trim lines use a 1.0-litre motor able to generate  and  torque, with a 5-speed manual transmission or a 6-speed automatic transmission. Its top trim line, Premier, uses a 1.2-litre motor able to generate  and  torque, and is only offered with a 6-speed automatic transmission. All motors are turbocharged. All versions have six airbags, ABS brakes and electronic stability control. In addition, the Onix includes a 7" (17 cm) infotainment system screen, OnStar services, and reverse sensor with camera.

Colombia
The second generation Onix was launched in Colombia as the "Onix Turbo" in March 2020. The first generation Onix is still on sale and renamed as "Chevrolet Joy" from November 2020. The sedan version was called Onix Sedán.

Uzbekistan 
The Onix has also been produced in Uzbekistan since 2022 by UzAuto Motors Sales began in late 2022. In early 2023, UzAuto Motors began to accept orders for new versions of the Chevrolet Onix Premier. In addition, the UzAuto Motors Powertrain plant also produces the 3-cylinder 1.2-litre turbocharged CSS Prime engine that the Onix uses.

Powertrain

Safety 
The Onix Plus and Hatchback, in their basic configuration with six airbags, both received 5 stars for adult occupants, 5 stars for infants, and an Advanced Award from Latin NCAP in 2019.

References

External links

 
 

Cars introduced in 2012
Cars of Brazil
Onix
2010s cars
Latin NCAP superminis